Frank Connor (1936–2022) was a Scottish footballer and manager.

Frank Connor or Conner may also refer to:

Frank Conner (athlete) (1908–1944), American Olympic athlete
Frank Connor (politician) (1916–1982), American politician in the state of Washington
Frank Conner (golfer) (born 1946), American golfer
Frank Conner (murderer)

See also
Frank Connors (1888–1963), Australian politician and trade unionist
Francis Connors (disambiguation)
Francis Connor (1857–1916), Australian businessman, pastoralist, and politician